Alex Pacheco may refer to:

 Alex Pacheco (baseball), baseball player
 Alex Pacheco (activist), American animal rights activist, and co-founder of PETA